In Return is the second studio album by British singer Shola Ama. It was released by Freakstreet and WEA on 8 November 1999 in the United Kingdom. The project saw Ama working with several producers, including Fred Jerkins III, Stargate, Shaun Labelle, Soulshock and Karlin, D'Influence and Ali Shaheed Muhammad. Co-writers included Angie Stone, Babyface, and David Foster. Two singles were released from the album: "Still Believe" and "Imagine", both reaching the top thirty of the UK Singles Chart.

Despite having support from her record label, In Return underperformed, barely reaching the top 100 in Germany and the UK. Following this, Ama took a break from recording.

Critical reception

Bryan Buss from AllMusic wrote that "sounding like a cross between Janet Jackson and Emilia, but with softer, more girlish, and more developed vocals, Ama's new CD is packed with pop songs perfectly tailored for 2000 [...] She sings with sincerity and conviction, often sounding like a heartbroken angel. With only hints of R&B, this is far more a pop album than anything else, though, despite the sheen, it isn't just for teenagers. This is good, old pop, a throwback to '60s girl groups with a contemporary twist."

UK garage remixes of "Imagine" and "Run to Me" by Club Asylum proved unpopular in 2000. NME included "Imagine" in their poor "25 essential UK garage anthems" list. Capital Xtra included "Run to Me" in their list of "The Best Old-School Garage Anthems of All Time".

Track listing

Charts

Release history

References 

1999 albums
Warner Music Group albums
Shola Ama albums
Albums produced by Stargate
Albums produced by Soulshock and Karlin